Zelleria maculata is an ermine moth species that is endemic to New Zealand. It feeds on Peraxilla tetrapetala as well as Peraxilla colensoi, mistletoe species that are also endemic to New Zealand.

Zelleria maculata was first described by Alfred Philpott in 1930.

References

External links

Citizen science observations of Zelleria maculata.

Yponomeutidae
Moths described in 1930
Moths of New Zealand
Endemic fauna of New Zealand
Endemic moths of New Zealand